Henry Wulff may refer to:
 Henry Wulff (Iowa politician) (born 1943)
 Henry Wulff (Illinois politician) (1854–1907)

See also
 Henry Wolf (disambiguation)
 Henry Wolff (disambiguation)